is a Japanese software engineer, mathematician, and origami artist. He is known for popularizing the method of utilizing crease patterns in designing origami models, with his 1985 publication Viva Origami, as well as other paperfolding-related theorems and mathematical analysis. One of them being Maekawa's theorem in relation to the flat-foldability of origami models.   
 
Maekawa currently serves on the committee board of the Japanese Origami Academic Society (JOAS), of which he also served as the committee-chief in the previous years. 
Outside of extensive research in mathematical-related topics, he also publishes articles on origami-related history and occurrences in the JOAS publications. He is the president of a software firm in Japan, and a member of the Astronomical Society of Japan.

Publications
Viva Origami, 1985
Genuine Origami (本格折り紙), 2007
Genuine Origami , 2009
Folding Geometry, 2016

References
Biography, Genuine Origami, 2007

See also
Mathematics of paper folding

Origami artists
1958 births
Living people